Point of Departure or Points of Departure may refer to:

Film and television
 Point of Departure (film), a 1966 Australian TV film
Points of Departure (Babylon 5), a 1994 episode

Literature and plays
 Point of Departure, an autobiography by James Cameron (1911–1985)
 The Point of Departure, an autobiography by Robin Cook, 2003
Point of Departure (play), or Eurydice, by Jean Anouilh, 1941
 Points of Departure, a political memoir by Dalton Camp, 1979
 Point of Departure, a concept in Alternative History literature referring to the moment when a decision could have been taken different from the one taken in actual history, leading to a different history.

Music
 Point of Departure (Gary McFarland album), 1963
 Point of Departure (Andrew Hill album), 1965

See also
Departure (disambiguation)
Takeoff, phase of flight from moving along the ground to flying in the air